Xu Yang (1712–after 1777) was a court painter to the Qianlong Emperor of the Qing dynasty.  A native of Suzhou, he was active ca. 1750–1776.

He painted 12 large silk scrolls, including The Qianlong Emperor's Southern Inspection Tour and Prosperous Suzhou.

References

External links

 Recording the Imperial Southern Inspection Tours, the imperial inspection tours of the Kangxi and Qianlong emperors.

1712 births
Painters from Suzhou
Qing dynasty painters
Year of death missing